Olesya Leonidovna Nurgalieva (born 9 January 1976 in Perm Krai) is a Russian ultramarathon runner. She won the Two Oceans Marathon 3 times and the Comrades Marathon twice, and together with her identical twin Elena Nurgalieva dominated the Comrades and Two Oceans, South Africa's main ultramarathons, from 2003 to 2014.

Ultramarathon career 
Nurgalieva won the 42.2 km Honolulu Marathon in 2005, the 56 km Two Oceans Marathon in 2008, 2010 and 2011, and the Comrades Marathon in 2007 and 2009.

References

External links 

1976 births
Living people
People from Perm Krai
Russian female long-distance runners
Russian female marathon runners
Russian ultramarathon runners
Twin sportspeople
Russian twins
Female ultramarathon runners
Sportspeople from Perm Krai
20th-century Russian women
21st-century Russian women